Local elections were held in South Korea in December 1960. Elections for special city and provincial councilors were held on 12 December, city, town and township councilors on 19 December, city, town and township mayors on 26 December and special city mayor and provincial governors on 29 December. A total of one special city mayor, nine provincial governors, 26 city mayors, 82 town mayors, 1,359 township mayors, 54 special city councilors, 433 provincial councilors, 420 city councilors, 1,055 town councilors and 15,376 township councilors were elected.

Special city and provincial elections

Councilors 
Elections for special city and provincial councilors were held on 12 December 1960.

Special city mayor and provincial governors 
Elections for special city mayor and provincial governors were held on 29 December 1960.

City, town and township elections

Councilors 
Elections for city, town and township councilors were held on 19 December 1960.

Mayors 
Elections for city, town and township mayors were held on 26 December 1960.

References 

1960 elections in South Korea
1960